Ilanga rhyssomphala is a species of sea snail, a marine gastropod mollusk in the family Solariellidae.

Description
The size of the shell varies between 5 mm and 7.6 mm.

Distribution
This marine species occurs off KwaZuluNatal to Zululand, South Africa

References

External links
 To World Register of Marine Species

rhyssomphala
Gastropods described in 1987